Darryl Usher (January 3, 1965 – February 24, 1990) was an American football wide receiver. He played for the San Diego Chargers and Phoenix Cardinals in 1989.

He was shot and killed on February 24, 1990, in Phoenix, Arizona at age 25.

References

1965 births
1990 deaths
Players of American football from Los Angeles
American football wide receivers
Illinois Fighting Illini football players
San Diego Chargers players
Phoenix Cardinals players
People murdered in Arizona
Deaths by firearm in Arizona